Amil is an American rapper and singer, born in 1973.

It is also a name of Arabic and Indian origin. Other uses:

Given name
Amil Kumar Das (1902–1961), Indian astronomer
Amil Mammedali oglu Maharramov (b 1974), an Azerbaijani economist 
Amil Niazi, Canadian writer
Amil Yunanov (born 1993), an Azerbaijani footballer

In fiction
Amil, a character in the British web series Corner Shop Show.

Places
Jabal Amil, A mountainous region in southern Lebanon